The 1980 Star World Championships were held in Rio de Janeiro, Brazil in 1980.

Results

References

Star World Championships
1980 in sailing
Sailing competitions in Brazil